The Jackson Purchase is a region of western Tennessee and southwestern Kentucky, bounded by the Tennessee River on the east, the Ohio River on the north, and the Mississippi River on the west, that was ceded to the United States by the Chickasaw in 1818.

Origin

The land was ceded after prolonged negotiations with the Chickasaw Indians in which the United States was represented by Andrew Jackson and Isaac Shelby, while the Chickasaws were represented by their chiefs, head men, and warriors including: Levi Colbert, his brother George Colbert, Chinubby, and Tishomingo.  On October 19, 1818, the two sides agreed to the transfer by signing the Treaty of Tuscaloosa.  The United States agreed to pay the Chickasaw people $300,000, at the rate of $20,000 annually for 15 years, in return for the right to all Chickasaw land east of the Mississippi River and north of the new state of Mississippi border.

Treaty ratification
The treaty was ratified by the United States Senate and confirmed by President James Monroe on January 7, 1819.

Legacy
In modern geographic usage, the name "Jackson Purchase" typically refers only to the portion of the historical region in the state of Kentucky.  The Tennessee portion of the historical region is known as "West Tennessee."

References

Historical regions in the United States
History of Tennessee
History of Kentucky
History of United States expansionism
1818 in the United States
Aboriginal title in the United States
October 1818 events
Regions of Kentucky
Regions of Tennessee
Chickasaw